The Winter Commission was a diocesan commission appointed in May 1989 by Alphonsus Liguori Penney, the Roman Catholic Archbishop of St. Johns, to conduct hearings surrounding the Mount Cashel abuse affairs.   

The commission headed by former Lieutenant Governor of Newfoundland and Labrador Gordon Arnaud Winter, a member of the Anglican Church of Canada. It conducted hearings in churches across the province, commencing on June 11, 1989. Its final report, submitted in 1990, was entitled The report of the Archdiocesan Commission of Enquiry into the Sexual Abuse of Children by Members of the Clergy.

Archbishop Penney resigned following the release of the commission's report, which placed some of the blame for cover-ups of the abuse on him.

See also
Catholic Church sexual abuse cases in Canada
Religious abuse
Roman Catholic Archdiocese of St. John's, Newfoundland
Sexual abuse cases in the Congregation of Christian Brothers
Sexual abuse in St. John's archdiocese

References

Catholic Church sexual abuse scandals in Canada
Academic literature about Catholic Church sexual abuse scandals
Child sexual abuse in Canada
1990 in Canada
1990 in Christianity
Canadian commissions and inquiries